Mala Ševnica is a small dispersed settlement north of Račje Selo in the Municipality of Trebnje in  Slovenia. The area is part of the traditional region of Lower Carniola and is now included in the Southeast Slovenia Statistical Region.

References

External links
Mala Ševnica at Geopedia

Populated places in the Municipality of Trebnje